Ferdinand III (6 May 1769 – 18 June 1824) was Grand Duke of Tuscany from 1790 to 1801 and, after a period of disenfranchisement, again from 1814 to 1824. He was also the Prince-elector and Grand Duke of Salzburg (1803–1805) and Grand Duke (and briefly Prince-Elector) of Würzburg (1805–1814).

Biography

Ferdinand was born in Florence, Tuscany, into the House of Habsburg-Lorraine. He was the second son of Leopold, then Grand-Duke of Tuscany, and his wife, Infanta Maria Luisa of Spain. When his father was elected Emperor of the Holy Roman Empire, Ferdinand succeeded him as Grand Duke of Tuscany, officially taking the office on 22 July 1790.

In 1792, during the French Revolution, Ferdinand became the first monarch to recognize the new French First Republic formally, and he attempted to work peacefully with it. As the French Revolutionary Wars commenced, however, the rulers of Britain and Russia persuaded him to join their side in the War of the First Coalition. Ferdinand provided his allies with passive support but no enthusiasm, and after he witnessed a year of resounding victories by the French, he became the first member of the coalition to give up. In a proclamation dated 1 March 1795, he abandoned the alliance and declared Tuscany's neutrality in the war.

His normalization of relations with France helped stabilize his rule for several years but by 1799 he was compelled to flee to Vienna for protection when republicans established a new government in Florence. He was forced to renounce his throne by the Treaty of Aranjuez (1801): Napoleon brushed him aside to make way for the Kingdom of Etruria, created as compensation for the Bourbon Dukes of Parma, dispossessed by the Peace of Lunéville in that same year.

Ferdinand was compensated with the Electorate of Salzburg, the secularized former territory of the Archbishopric of Salzburg. He was also made a Prince-elector of the Holy Roman Empire (a role which expired with the Empire's dissolution in 1806), receiving the title and land on 26 December 1802.

On 25 December 1805, Ferdinand had to give up Salzburg as well, which by the Treaty of Pressburg was annexed by his older brother, Emperor Francis II. Ferdinand was then made Duke of Würzburg, a new state created for him from the old Bishopric of Würzburg, while remaining an Elector. With the dissolution of the Empire in 1806, he took the new title of Grand Duke of Würzburg.

On 30 May 1814, after Napoleon's fall, Ferdinand was restored as Grand Duke of Tuscany.

Ferdinand died in 1824 in Florence and was succeeded by his son Leopold.

Family and children
In Naples on 15 August 1790 by proxy and in Vienna on 19 September 1790 in person, Ferdinand married firstly his double first cousin, Princess Luisa of Naples and Sicily (1773-1802), daughter of Ferdinand I of the Two Sicilies and Maria Carolina of Austria.

Their children were:

 Archduchess Carolina Ferdinanda of Austria (2 August 1793 – 5 January 1802)
 Francesco Leopoldo, Grand Prince of Tuscany (15 December 1794 – 18 May 1800)
 Leopoldo II, Grand Duke of Tuscany (3 October 1797 – 29 January 1870)
 Archduchess Maria Luisa of Austria (30 August 1798 – 15 June 1857)
 Archduchess Maria Teresa of Austria (21 March 1801 – 12 January 1855)

Their first two children, Carolina and Francesco, died at very young ages (eight and five respectively) but the later three prospered under their father's care. Luisa died when they were all quite young, on 19 September 1802, together with a stillborn son who was unnamed. Two decades later, in Florence on 6 May 1821, Ferdinand married again, this time to the much younger Princess Maria Ferdinanda of Saxony (1796-1865). She was the daughter of Maximilian, Prince of Saxony, and his wife, Caroline of Parma; she was also his first cousin once removed, as well as the first cousin once removed of the dead Luisa. Though Ferdinand was likely hoping to produce another male heir, there were no children born of this second marriage.

Ancestry

Notes

References

External links
  House of Habsburg, Tuscan Branch, family tree by Ferdinand Schevill in A Political History of Modern Europe (1909)

Grand Dukes of Tuscany
1769 births
1824 deaths
Austrian princes
Tuscan princes
House of Habsburg-Lorraine
Nobility from Florence
18th-century Italian people
19th-century Italian people
18th century in the Grand Duchy of Tuscany
19th century in the Grand Duchy of Tuscany
18th-century monarchs in Europe
19th-century monarchs in Europe
Generals of the Holy Roman Empire
Grand Masters of the Order of Saint Joseph
Knights of the Golden Fleece of Austria
Grand Crosses of the Order of Saint Stephen of Hungary
Grand Croix of the Légion d'honneur
Burials at San Lorenzo, Florence
Sons of emperors
Children of Leopold II, Holy Roman Emperor
Sons of kings